Antonio Diziani (9 February 1737 – 23 June 1797) was an Italian painter of the 18th century, active mainly in painting vedute or landscapes and vistas of Venice.

His father, Gaspare Diziani, was a prominent rococo artist who painted canvases and decorative frescoes, but Antonio was more strongly influenced by Francesco Zuccarelli and Giuseppe Zais. He was a contemporary of Canaletto. In 1774 he was elected a member of the Painting and Sculpture Academy in Venice.

References
Web gallery of art biography

Gallery

18th-century Italian painters
Italian male painters
Italian vedutisti
Painters from Venice
1737 births
1797 deaths
18th-century Italian male artists